The following is a list of players and who appeared in at least one game for the Kansas City Packers franchise of the Federal League from  through .

Keys

List of players

References

External links
Baseball Reference

Major League Baseball all-time rosters
Roster